Carlos Mario Rodríguez Torres (born January 30, 1995) is a Colombian professional footballer who plays as a midfielder for Atlético Huila.

External links
 
 

Living people
1995 births
Colombian footballers
Colombian expatriate footballers
Association football midfielders
Atlético F.C. footballers
Fortaleza C.E.I.F. footballers
Club Puebla players
Deportivo Cali footballers
La Equidad footballers
Categoría Primera A players
Categoría Primera B players
Liga MX players
Colombian expatriate sportspeople in Mexico
Expatriate footballers in Mexico
People from La Guajira Department